Light Chaser Animation Studios is a Chinese CG animation film studio based in Beijing, China. The studio was founded in early 2013 by Gary Wang, the founder and ex-CEO of the popular Chinese video sharing website Tudou.com.

History 

In an interview with the Wall Street Journal on March 12, 2013, Gary Wang announced Light Chaser Animation, a movie studio to produce animated feature films targeting the rapidly growing Chinese movie market, which grew by 30% in 2012 and is widely expected to overtake the U.S. market in size by 2020. He cited the lack of quality domestically produced animation content, a rapidly growing domestic market, and improving environment for movie distribution, promotion and copyrights in China as the main reasons behind his decision.

Light Chaser's website states that its main goal is to "create world-class animated films".

Their first animated feature, Little Door Gods, directed by Gary Wang opened in China on January 1, 2016. It premiered in the United States on May 20, 2017 at the Seattle International Film Festival.

Light Chaser's second feature film, Tea Pets, was released in China on July 21, 2017.  In the United States, Vision Films distributed the movie as "Toys & Pets". An airline safety video was made for Hainan Airlines starring this film's characters.

Their third feature film, Cats and Peachtopia, was released in China on April 5, 2018.  In the United States, Viva Pictures released the movie as "Cats" on DirecTV Pay-per-view in late 2019, and distributed the movie theatrically on January 24, 2020.

Their fourth feature film, White Snake, directed by Amp Wong and Zhao Ji was released on January 11, 2019 in China. The film received a limited release in the United States and Canada on November 15, 2019, with GKIDS acting as the distributor. It also debuted in France at the Annecy International Animated Film Festival. The film is a co-production with American studio Warner Bros. Warner Bros. has rights in China and is credited as a co-producer due to its significant involvement in the creation of the film. The film won the Golden Angel for "Best Chinese & American Co-Production Animation Film" at the Chinese American Film Festival.

Their fifth film, New Gods: Nezha Reborn, was released in february 2021. A works-in-process feature about the film will premiere at the Annecy International Animated Film Festival.

The company has been focusing on animation production technology since its establishment, and is building its own render farm and developing technology. In addition, the software has introduced Maya, Houdini, ZBrush, Arnold, etc.

Filmography

References

External links
Website of Light Chaser Animation Studios

Chinese animation studios
Companies based in Beijing
Mass media companies established in 2013
Chinese companies established in 2013